"Try Me Out" is a song by Italian band Corona, released in July 1995 as the third single from their debut album, The Rhythm of the Night (1995). The song is written by Francesco Bontempi, Giorgio Spagna and Annerley Gordon. Going for a harder, more underground house music sound, it became a successful club hit in many European countries. It peaked within the top 10 in Denmark, Finland, Ireland, Italy, Scotland, Spain, the UK, as well as on the Eurochart Hot 100. Outside Europe, the song was a top 10 hit also in Israel, Australia, and on the US Billboard Hot Dance Club Play chart, while peaking at number 43 in New Zealand. It contains samples from the 1987 song "Toy" by Teen Dream.

Critical reception
AllMusic editor Jose F. Promis described the song as a "catchy Euro hit", picking it as one of the standout tracks on the album. Larry Flick from Billboard wrote, "One of the leading acts of the ongoing Euro-NRG invasion of the pop mainstream unleashes another sparkler from the album The Rhythm of the Night. Corona is as giddy as an ingenue can be, and she is surrounded by a storm of syncopated beats and rollicking piano lines." Writing for Dotmusic, James Masterton said, "Unlike most production-line Italian dance, Corona singles do tend to have some song substance to them which has no doubt helped their chart performance". He concluded, "Top 10 could not be out of the question for this one either." 

Alan Jones from Music Week commented, "Less immediate than "Rhythm Of The Night" and "Baby Baby", Corona's "Try Me Out" is another slab of unsubtle Nu-NRG, best served by Lee Marrow's mixes. It's not as immediate or commercial as Corona's two big hits, but it's certain to find an instant home in the upper half of the Top 40." In an retrospective review, Pop Rescue described it as a "Euro dance romp with house pianos and powerful vocals". Daisy & Havoc from the RM Dance Update rated it four out of five, complimenting it as a "catchy song". Another editor, James Hamilton declared it as "nasally chanted Italo disco in typical romping 0-131-0bpm Lee Marrow Eurobeat (with some good breaks)".

Chart performance
"Try Me Out" made an impact on the charts on several continents, becoming a sizeable hit in many countries. In Europe, it was a top 10 hit in Denmark, Finland, Ireland, Scotland, Spain and the UK. In the latter, the single peaked at number six on July 30, 1995, in its third week on the UK Singles Chart. The song stayed on that position for two weeks. In the band's native Italy, it peaked at number two in Musica e dischi, while on the Eurochart Hot 100, it reached number seven. Additionally, it was a top 20 hit in Austria, France, Iceland and Sweden. Outside Europe, it charted at number seven in Israel, number ten in both Australia and on the US Billboard Hot Dance Club Play chart, number 38 on the Billboard Hot Dance Music/Maxi-Singles Sales chart, and number 43 in New Zealand. On the Canadian RPM Dance/Urban chart, the song peaked at number 20. It was awarded with a gold record in Australia for 35,000 singles sold, and a silver record in the UK, after 241,000 units were sold.

Music video
A music video was produced to promote the single. It sees the singer, Olga de Souza performing in different coloured cube-shaped rooms. Red, green and blue rooms appear to be mixed and laid on top of each other, like a Rubik's Cube. The opening and throughout the video, different people are watching a View-Master. At the most, nine cubical rooms are seen at once. They are sliding horizontally, vertical or inclined. Sometimes dancers are performing in these and other times they watches each other, through peepholes between the rooms. At the end all the nine cubes has been solved; top row in blue, middle row in red and bottom row in green. The video was later published on YouTube in April 2014, and had amassed almost four million views as of January 2023.

Track listings

 7" maxi
 "Try Me Out" (Lee Marrow eurobeat mix) — 5:10
 "Try Me Out" (Alex Party cool mix) — 5:40
 "Try Me Out" (Lee Marrow club mix) — 6:02
 "Try Me Out" (Lee Marrow trouble mix) — 6:05

 12"
 "Try Me Out" (Lee Marrow Eurobeat Mix) — 5:10
 "Try Me Out" (Lee Marrow Club Mix) — 6:02
 "Try Me Out" (Alex Party Cool Mix) — 5:40
 "Try Me Out" (MK Vocal Mix) — 7:21

 CD single
 "Try Me Out" (Lee Marrow airplay mix) — 3:29
 "Try Me Out" (Lee Marrow eurobeat mix) — 5:10
 "Try Me Out" (Alex Party cool mix) — 5:40
 "Try Me Out" (MK radio edit) — 3:40

 CD single
 "Try Me Out" (Radio Edit) — 3:29
 "Try Me Out" (Lee Marrow Club Mix) — 6:02

 CD maxi (August 25, 1995)
 "Try Me Out" (Lee Marrow radio mix) — 3:29
 "Try Me Out" (Lee Marrow club mix) — 6:02
 "Try Me Out" (Lee Marrow eurobeat mix) — 5:10
 "Try Me Out" (Alex Party cool mix) — 5:40
 "Try Me Out" (MK vocal mix) — 7:21
 "Try Me Out" (Lee Marrow trouble mix) — 6:05
 "Try Me Out" (MK dub mix) — 7:28

 CD maxi (UK) (on WEA label)
 "Try Me Out" (Lee Marrow airplay mix) — 3:26
 "Try Me Out" (Lee Marrow eurobeat mix) — 5:08
 "Try Me Out" (Alex Party cool mix) — 5:40
 "Try Me Out" (MK radio edit) — 3:39
 "Try Me Out" (Lee Marrow club mix) — 6:03
 "Try Me Out" (MK vocal mix) — 7:21
 "Try Me Out" (Lee Marrow trouble mix) — 6:27

Personnel

 Written by Francesco Bontempi, Giorgio Spagna and Annerley Gordon
 Created, arranged and produced by Checco and Soul Train for Lee Marrow productions
 'Lee Marrow Airplay Mix', 'Lee Marrow Eurobeat Mix', 'Lee Marrow Club Mix' and 'Lee Marrow Trouble Mix' : 
 Remixed by Lee Marrow
 Sound engineer : Francesco Alberti at Casablanca Recordings (Italy)

 'Alex Party Cool Mix' : Remixed by Visnadi with Alex Natale DJ at "77 Studio" Mestre (Venice, Italy)
 'MK Radio Edit' and 'MK Vocal Mix' : Remix and additional production by Marc Kinchen for MCT

Charts

Weekly charts

Year-end charts

Certifications

References

1995 singles
1995 songs
Corona (band) songs
Electronic songs
English-language Italian songs
House music songs
Songs written by Ann Lee (singer)
Songs written by Giorgio Spagna